The 1909 Victorian Football Association season was the 33rd season of the Australian rules football competition. The premiership was won by the Brunswick Football Club, after it defeated minor premiers Prahran by 17 points in the Grand Final on 25 September. It was the first premiership won by the club.

Association Membership 
In September 1908, a group of stakeholders emerged keen to re-form a West Melbourne Football Club under an entirely new committee, after the club had been banished from the Association for attempting to join the VFL in 1908. The same process had taken place to re-establish a North Melbourne Football Club during the previous preseason. The new club was established under the name of City of Melbourne Football Club and applied to join the Association.

At the Association's meeting on 2 November 1908, the application was rejected on the basis of concern about the effect of an eleventh club on the Association's strength. The Association instead proposed that City of Melbourne consider amalgamating with North Melbourne, with the merged entity to be named either City of Melbourne or Melbourne (Association), with prominent public figures confirming that a more central name and image would open the club to wider public support. The proposal was discussed in December, but the North Melbourne members preferred to retain their traditional image, and voted down the proposal by 37–18. As such, the membership of the Association remained unchanged for 1909.

Premiership 
The home-and-home season was played over eighteen rounds, with each club playing the others twice; then, the top four clubs contested a finals series under the amended Argus system to determine the premiers for the season.

Ladder

Finals

Semi-finals

Preliminary Final

Grand Final

Notable events 
 Northcote moved its home ground from Northcote Park to Croxton Park from this season.

External links 
 Victorian Football Association/Victorian Football League history (1877–2008)
 List of VFA premiers

References 

Victorian Football League seasons
VFL